José Núñez may refer to:

José Núñez (President of Nicaragua), Politician from the Solentiname archipelago
José Núñez (footballer), Spanish professional footballer
José Núñez (right-handed pitcher) b. 1964, baseball pitcher for the Toronto Blue Jays and Chicago Cubs
José Núñez (left-handed pitcher) b. 1979, baseball pitcher for the Los Angeles Dodgers and San Diego Padres
Jose Nuñez (DJ), late dance music remixer and producer during the 1980s
José Ariel Núñez, Paraguayan footballer